HK Mogo/LSPA is a Latvian ice hockey team that plays in the Optibet Hockey League, the top tier of the sport in Latvia. The team is based in Riga and play their home games at the Mogo ice hall.

History
HK Mogo was founded in 2014 by the Latvian company Mogo Finance and joined the Latvian Hockey Higher League for the start of the 2014–15 season. Mogo's debut season was a strong one, finishing in first place with 73 points, seven points ahead of the second placed HK Liepāja. As a result of their first-place finish in the regular season Mogo advanced straight to the playoff semifinals, bypassing the first round. They made it to the final, after beating HK Zemgale/JLSS in the semi's, where they faced-off against HK Kurbads in a best of seven series, in which Mogo were triumphant, winning the championship in their debut season. The following season saw Mogo finish in 2nd place in the regular season as they looked to defend their championship; they made it to the play-off semi finals before losing to cross-town rivals HK Kurbads. Mogo would however win the bronze medal game against HK Prizma, allowing them to collect their second medal in as many years. The 2016–17 season saw Mogo finish top of the table in the regular season, ahead of second place team HK Kurbads by 6 points. Kurbads would have a measure of revenge however, as they beat Mogo in the play-off final, with Mogo having to settle for the silver medal. Mogo would again finish the season in 1st place during the 2017–18 season of the newly renamed Optibet Hockey League, which saw them lead 2nd place team HK Liepāja by 12 points, however, they lost in the play-off semi-final to HK Zemgale/JLSS who would subsequently lose in the final to HK Kurbads. The following season Mogo, who strengthened their side by signing former KHL player Kaspars Saulietis in the off-season, finished in 1st place for the third year running, after securing a comfortable lead at the top of the table - 18 points clear of the second place Zemgale. They would see further success in the play-offs, beating rivals Kurbads in overtime during Game 6 of the finals to claim their 2nd Latvian championship. In the off-season Mogo further strengthened their team by signing 3-time Olympian and KHL veteran Krišjānis Rēdlihs, who helped the team to a third place finish in the regular season, before the play-offs were cancelled due to COVID-19 pandemic.

In 2020 Mogo formed a partnership with the Latvian Academy of Sport Education and a result the team changed their name to HK Mogo/LSPA

In 2015 the Latvian Ice Hockey Federation announced the re-launch of the Latvian Cup which had been dormant since 2008, and that it would be open to all Latvian Hockey Higher League and 1.Līga clubs. Mogo, along with HK Kurbads, advanced straight to the second round of the 2015–16 competition as a result of being the finalists in the 2014–15 Latvian Hockey Higher League playoffs. Mogo made it to final, having beaten both Daugavpils/LDZ Cargo of the 1.Līga and HK Zemgale/JLSS in the previous rounds, where they faced HK Kurbads. Mogo would beat Kurbads 4–3 at Arena Riga, having been trailing the game until midway through the third period. The 2016/17 Cup again saw Kurbads vs Mogo in the final, with Mogo again being victorious, beating Kurbads in overtime 3-2. In the 2017/18 edition of the tournament, the two rivals would meet in the finals for the third year in a row, with Mogo once again being triumphant, with the game finishing the same way it did the year previously; with a 3-2 overtime victory. Following this edition of the Cup, the competition was once again discontinued.

As a result of winning the Latvian Hockey Higher League play-offs in 2015, Mogo qualified for the 2015–16 IIHF Continental Cup where they entered in the second round. Mogo was drawn in Group B with CH Jaca of Spain, Slovenian side HDD Jesenice and Hungarian's Miskolci Jegesmedve. Mogo finished the round-robin Group B tournament in first place after winning all three of their games, and advanced to the third round where they were drawn in Group D against Italian outfit HC Asiago, Danish champions Herning Blue Fox and Yertis Pavlodar from Kazkhstan. Mogo failed to win any of their three games in the third round, finishing in last place and failing to qualify for the final round. HK Mogo would return to continental competition for the 2019–20 Continental Cup as a result of winning their second Latvian championship. They were placed in Group C alongside Ukrainian team HC Donbass, Corona Brașov of Romania and Serbian outfit Crvena Zvezda Belgrade. Mogo beat both Corona Brașov and Crvena Zvezda, however, ultimately lost in a shoot-out to Donbass, resulting in Mogo finishing in 2nd place and not progressing in the competition.

In 2020 HK Mogo took place in the inaugural Baltic Hockey League, a competition made up of two teams from each of Estonia, Latvia and Lithuania. They finished second in their group after beating Kaunas Hockey, however, their final game against Tartu Välk 494 was cancelled after 4 of the Välk 494 squad tested positive for COVID-19. Despite this, both Välk 494 and HK Mogo qualified for the final round, as both teams had already beaten the Lithuanian team. The finals of the tournament were scheduled to take place in February 2021, having been postponed from December 2020 to several HK Mogo players contracting the virus. In early February the final round was again postponed due to the pandemic, with the date to be announced when the Covid situation improves.

Rivalry with HK Kurbads
Due to both teams being based in Riga, and the two sides often facing each other in the play-off and Latvian cup finals, a rivalry between the two developed, with even the regular season meetings carrying some increased significance.

Roster
Updated February 17, 2021.

Season-by-season record
Note: GP = Games played, W = Wins, L = Losses, T = Ties, OTL = Overtime losses, Pts = Points, GF = Goals for, GA = Goals against, PIM = Penalties in minutes

Honours
Latvian Championships:
 2015, 2019

Latvian Cup
 2016, 2017, 2018.

Team records

Career
These are the top five scorers in HK Mogo history.

''Note: Pos = Position; GP = Games played; G = Goals; A = Assists; Pts = Points

Penalty minutes: Elvis Želubovskis, 411

Season

Regular season 
 Most goals in a season: Elvis Želubovskis, 26 (2016–17)
 Most assists in a season: Krišs Lipsbergs, 30 (2016–17)
 Most points in a season: Elvis Želubovskis, 54 (2016–17)
 Most penalty minutes in a season: Elvis Želubovskis, 93 (2019–20)

Playoffs 
 Most goals in a playoff season: Miks Lipsbergs, 8 (2014–15)
 Most assists in a playoff season: Oļegs Sorokins, 9 (2014–15)
 Most points in a playoff season: Miks Lipsbergs, 14 (2014–15)
 Most penalty minutes in a playoff season: Elvis Želubovskis, 33 (2017–18)

Notable players
 Krišjānis Rēdlihs
 Kaspars Saulietis

Notable coaches
 Ģirts Ankipāns

References

External links
HK Mogo 
 

2014 establishments in Latvia
Ice hockey clubs established in 2014
Ice hockey teams in Riga
Latvian Hockey League teams